Extra-amniotic administration is a route of administration to the space between the fetal membranes and endometrium inside the uterus of a pregnant woman. 

It can be used to administer drugs affecting uterus motility, such as oxytocin and prostaglandins, e.g. in labor induction or medical abortion.

References

Drug delivery devices
Dosage forms